Al-Qamsiyah is a town in northwestern Syria, administratively part of the Tartus Governorate, located north of Tartus. Nearby localities include al-Annazeh, Maten al-Sahel and Husayn al-Baher to the southwest and Khawabi, Khirbet al-Faras and al-Shaykh Badr to the southeast. According to the Syria Central Bureau of Statistics (CBS), al-Qamsiyah had a population of 2,244 in the 2004 census. Its inhabitants are predominantly Alawites.

References

Populated places in Al-Shaykh Badr District
Towns in Syria
Alawite communities in Syria